Mauricio José Arroyo Bertel (born September 18, 1990) is a Colombian central midfielder who currently plays for Independiente Medellín.

Colombia national under-20 football team (2007–2009) where he was once the captain after a great showing in a Youth tournament in Spain where he out shined many of the more know players playing abroad. After helping Real Cartagena get in position to be promoted into the Copa Mustang, has helped him get a call up to the full Colombia national football team where he will debut at the age of 18 on November 19 against Nigeria.

External links
- Arroyo to Spain

Living people
1990 births
Colombian footballers
Real Cartagena footballers
Gimnàstic de Tarragona footballers
Independiente Medellín footballers
Colombian expatriate footballers
Expatriate footballers in Spain
Association football midfielders
Footballers from Bogotá
21st-century Colombian people